
Dede , also called Dede@Customs House, is a Turkish restaurant in Baltimore, County Cork, Ireland. It was awarded a Michelin star in 2021.

History
Head chef Ahmet Dede, a native of Ankara, was previously head chef at Mews, another Michelin-starred restaurant in Baltimore. He founded Dede in 2020 with business partner Maria Archer. It opened on 27 April.

Instead of the elaborate tasting menu found in most modern haute cuisine restaurants, Dede serves "a less formal dinner with fewer but larger courses." The food is sourced from Cape Clear Island and other local County Cork producers.

Dede received a Michelin star in 2021; the Guide Michelin recommended the lobster kebab with isot pepper; wild Irish venison with buckwheat and orange; and the hazelnut baklava.

Awards
 Michelin star: 2021

See also
List of Michelin starred restaurants in Ireland

References

External links

Baltimore, County Cork
Culture in County Cork
Michelin Guide starred restaurants in Ireland
2020 establishments in Ireland
Turkish restaurants
Turkish diaspora in Europe